Camden railway station was a railway station in Camden and the terminus of the Camden line in South Western Sydney. It opened along with the line on 10 March 1882 and closed along with it on 1 January 1963. Apart from the station master's residence, the station is no longer extant.

History 

Camden station opened on its first location on 10 March 1882, 11.56 kilometres from the junction with the Main Southern line. A waiting shed existed on the down track, as well as a run-round. In January 1883, the line was extended and the station was relocated. At this point, there was a goods siding, as well as a siding on the up track and a crossover. The station has a waiting shed and an office, whereas the original waiting shed from the initial temporary site was moved to Kirkham Lane. A station master's house was constructed in 1889 next to the passenger station building, which was moved in 1901. Some improvements were also made to the station.

In 1930, a siding was created to serve Dairy Farmers.

The Camden line had been perpetually unprofitable and lacked investment, and a bus service had operated the length of the line in 1925 and from 23 February 1961. The line closed on 1 January 1963. The final train departed Campbelltown just after midnight and arrived at Camden at 12:55am.

Services 
The Camden line initially carried three daily return services, which was later increased to six, with a journey time to Campbelltown of approximately 40 minutes.

See also 

 Camden railway line

References 

Camden, New South Wales
Disused railway stations in Sydney
Railway stations in Australia opened in 1882
Railway stations closed in 1963
1963 disestablishments in Australia